Orodes IV of Elymais was the ruler of Elymais in the second half of the 2nd-century. He may be the same Orodes mentioned in the inscriptions of the Tang-e Sarvak site.

References

Sources 
 

2nd-century Iranian people
Arsacid dynasty of Elymais
2nd-century deaths
Year of birth unknown
Vassal rulers of the Parthian Empire